Vetelino Nau is a Wallisian politician and former member of the Territorial Assembly of Wallis and Futuna. He was President of the Territorial Assembly from April to November 2012.

Nau is from Alu in Futuna and was a schoolteacher before entering politics. He was first elected to the Territorial Assembly in the 1997 election. In 2002 he was a founder of the People's Union for Wallis and Futuna (UPFW).

He contested wallis and Futuna's senate seat in the 2008 French Senate election, losing to Robert Laufoaulu by 8 votes to 13. He was re-elected to the Territorial Assembly at the 2012 election and elected as president of the assembly, becoming the first Socialist to hold the position. He was replaced by Sosefo Suve in November 2012.

He contested the 2014 French Senate election, but again lost to Robert Laufoaulu, this time by 7 votes to 15. Following the election he failed to present accounts of his campaign expenses, and was barred from office for a year.

He was not re-elected at the 2017 election.

References

Living people
Wallis and Futuna politicians
Presidents of the Territorial Assembly of Wallis and Futuna
Year of birth missing (living people)